Suada may refer to:

 As-Suwayda, a city in Syria
 Suada (butterfly), a genus of grass skipper butterflies
 Suada, a female Islamic name, cognate of Suad, popular among Azerbaijani people and Bosniaks
 Suada Alakbarova, Azerbaijani representative in the Junior Eurovision Song Contest 2012
 Suada Dilberović, Bosnian war victim
 "Suada" (song), by Plavi Orkestar, appeared on Soldatski bal
 Suada (or Suadela), a goddess in Roman mythology